The Sheraton Samoa Aggie Grey's Hotel & Bungalows is a historic hotel in Apia, Samoa.

History 
It was opened in 1933 by the Samoan entrepreneur Aggie Grey, and became a popular gathering place for American servicemen stationed in Samoa during World War II.  Many notable actors, including Dorothy Lamour, Marlon Brando, Gary Cooper, William Holden, Raymond Burr and Robert Morley stayed at the hotel. It was involved with the production and housing of the crew on the American film production of Return to Paradise (1953) starring Gary Cooper. 

The hotel was owned by Grey Investment Group, the company founded by Aggie Grey.  Since 2016 it has been part of the Sheraton chain. In 2018 the hotel was sold by New Zealand based real estate agents Gollins Commercial to Chinese investors.

References

External links 

 Sheraton Samoa Aggie Grey's Hotel & Bungalows

Sheraton hotels
Buildings and structures in Apia
Hotels in Samoa
2018 mergers and acquisitions
Hotels established in 1933
2016 mergers and acquisitions